Pierre Augustin Charles Bourguignon Derbigny (June 30, 1769 – October 6, 1829) was the sixth Governor of Louisiana. Born in 1769, at Laon, France, the eldest son of Augustin Bourguignon d'Herbigny who was President of the Directoire de l'Aisne and Mayor of Laon, and Louise Angélique Blondela.

Derbigny studied law at Ste. Genevieve but fled France in 1791 during the French Revolution. He first went to Saint-Domingue, and then arrived in Pittsburgh, Pennsylvania, and married Felicité Odile de Hault de Lassus with whom he had five daughters and two sons.

He moved, first to Missouri, then Florida, and finally to Louisiana, arriving in New Orleans, then a Spanish colony, in 1797. In 1803 he became private secretary to Etienne Bore, mayor of New Orleans, and was appointed Secretary of the Legislative Council. In the same year Governor Claiborne appointed him official interpreter of languages for the territory. After the United States' annexation of the Louisiana Purchase in 1803, Derbigny was one of the representatives of the new Americans in Washington seeking self-government for the Orleans Territory. His oration of July 4, 1804, also urges for the reopening of the slave trade.

As the territory was integrated into the United States, Derbigny opposed British common law in Louisiana and defended the retention of civil law practices established during the French and Spanish colonial periods. Following the Governance Act of 1804 that set up Louisiana's territorial government, Derbigny, along with Jean Noel Destréhan and Pierre Sauve, delivered to Washington, D.C., the protest created by citizens speaking out against this Congressional Act. This complaint was entitled, "Remonstrance of the People of Louisiana against the Political System Adopted by Congress for Them," and was ultimately presented to President Thomas Jefferson by the three men from Louisiana.

Pierre Derbigny also led a movement to establish the College of Orleans and served as Regent. In 1812, he was selected as Secretary of the Territorial Senate. He also served in Captain Chauveneau's Company of cavalry in the Louisiana Militia.

He resigned from the Legislature to become a justice of the Louisiana Supreme Court. His nomination was first rejected by the Senate, but was afterwards returned and confirmed at the Senate's request. He served as a Justice from 1814 to 1820.

In 1820, Derbigny resigned from the Supreme Court of Louisiana to run unsuccessfully for Governor against J. N. Destréhan, Abner L. Duncan, and Thomas B. Robertson. Despite his loss to Robertson, Derbigny was appointed Secretary of State of Louisiana and served from 1821 to 1828. He was one of the principal drafters of the 1825 Civil Code of Louisiana, along with Edward Livingston, François Xavier Martin, and Louis Moreau-Lislet.

In 1828, he ran for Governor again and this time defeated his former supporter Bernard de Marigny, Thomas Butler, and Congressman Philemon Thomas. The Louisiana State Legislature confirmed his election over the other three candidates. Derbigny was affiliated with the nascent National Republican Party, an anti-Jackson group.

In Derbigny's inauguration speech, he urged internal improvements, which the legislature supported, including: incorporation of a gas light company for New Orleans, several navigation companies for the Mississippi River and important bayous in the state, and the construction and repair of levees. On October 3, 1829, after ten months in office, Governor Derbigny was thrown from a (horse-drawn) carriage and died three days later, in Gretna, Louisiana. Pierre Derbigny was interred in Saint Louis Cemetery Number 1 in New Orleans.

See also
List of U.S. state governors born outside the United States

Sources
State of Louisiana - Biography

References 

1769 births
1829 deaths
People from Laon
Louisiana National Republicans
Governors of Louisiana
Secretaries of State of Louisiana
Justices of the Louisiana Supreme Court
French emigrants to the United States
National Republican Party state governors of the United States